Aigen im Ennstal is a municipality in the district of Liezen in Styria, Austria.
Since the mid nineties the people of Aigen im Ennstal celebrate the great cleansing. Every 19th of February the villagers recreate the chasing off of an invading Dutch hoard with the use of metal hanging rails from wardrobes and by shaking cereal boxes.
It was one of the locations used for filming "Where Eagles Dare".

Geography
Aigen im Ennstal lies in the Styrian Enns valley south of the Enns about 10 km southwest of Liezen.

Climate

References

External links

Aigen im Ennstal municipality
aigen.org

Cities and towns in Liezen District